Puiești is a commune in Buzău County, Muntenia, Romania, with a population of approximately 4,590.

Location
Puiești is situated in the northeast of Buzău County, about 15 km East from the city Râmnicu Sărat, on the border with Vrancea County.

It is composed of seven villages: Dăscălești, Lunca, Măcrina, Nicolești, Plopi, Puieștii de Jos (the commune centre) and Puieștii de Sus.

Economy
Most of the inhabitants of this commune practice agriculture in small family farms. There is a church, a police station, a small hospital, a primary school and a few places to go out like bars and pubs.

Notes

Communes in Buzău County
Localities in Muntenia